The Following is a List of Flags used in Christmas Island in Australia

State Flag

Historical Flags

See also

List of Australian flags

References 

Australia
 
Flags of Christmas Island